Cary Castle stood on Lodge Hill overlooking the town of Castle Cary, Somerset, England. It is a Scheduled Ancient Monument.

Details

The motte and bailey castle was built either by Walter of Douai or by his son Robert who also built Bampton Castle in Devon. During The Anarchy Robert was exiled by King Stephen and the castle given to Ralph Lovel who then sided with Robert, 1st Earl of Gloucester against the king. King Stephen abandoned his siege of Bristol in 1138 and besieged Cary Castle with fire and showers of stones from siege engines. This lasted until the garrison surrendered due to hunger.

In 1143 Stephen lost control of the West Country after the Battle of Wilton. Henry de Tracy gained control of Cary Castle and built another stronghold in front of the older castle, however this was demolished when William Fitz Robert, 2nd Earl of Gloucester and his troops arrived to take the castle. The Lovels later achieved the return of the castle, and their descendants were lords of the manor until the 14th century.

By 1468 the castle had been abandoned. Around that time a manor house was built on or adjacent to the site of the castle, possibly by Baron Zouche. It later passed to Edward Seymour, 1st Duke of Somerset but by the 1630s it was occupied by Edward Kirton. It was largely demolished at the end of the 18th century.

The site was excavated in 1890 and demonstrated the foundations of a 24-metre square stone keep and an inner and outer bailey.

All that remains are the earthworks. Some of the castle's stonework may be seen in the town's buildings, and the Castle Cary and District Museum has a display about its history.

See also
Castles in Great Britain and Ireland
List of castles in England

References

Sources
Fry, Plantagenet Somerset, The David & Charles Book of Castles, David & Charles, 1980. 

Castles in Somerset
Scheduled monuments in South Somerset